Elisabeth Langgässer (23 February 1899 – 25 July 1950) was a German author and teacher. She is known for lyrical poetry and novels. Her short story Saisonbeginn, for example, provides a graphically human portrayal of a 1930s German Alpine village erecting a sign forbidding the entry of Jews.

Early life 
In 1899 Langgässer was born in Alzey into a middle-class Catholic family. In 1922 Langgässer became a school teacher. Following an affair with Hermann Heller she gave birth to her illegitimate daughter Cordelia in 1929. As a consequence she was sacked from her teaching position.

Publications during the Weimar Republic 
From 1924 onwards Langgässer published poetry and reviews. After losing her employment as a teacher she devoted herself to a literary career. Her writings were regarded as Naturmagie (nature magic), where a magic sense unfolded within the realm of an ambivalent nature. This movement was connected with writers who published in the journal Die Kolonne between 1929 and 1932. Other members of the Naturmagie literary movement were Günter Eich, Horst Lange, Peter Huchel, Wilhelm Lehmann and Oskar Loerke.

Persecution in the Third Reich 
Langgässer became a member of the Reichsschrifttumskammer (Reich Chamber of Literature). In 1935 Langgässer married Wilhelm Hoffman and together they had three daughters. Langgässer was classified as a "half-Jew" due to Jewish relations on her father's side of the family. She was excluded on racial grounds from the Reich Chamber of Literature and appealed to Hans Hinkel in August 1937 and then to Goebbels in April 1938. In the appeal letters she makes reference to the pure Aryan line on her mother's side and points to the criticism of her literary work by the Jewish author Alfred Döblin. After her death the letters were used as evidence for Langgässer's willingness to compromise, accusations that she had prostituted herself politically, or were interpreted as interventions by a Catholic German citizen who had not yet seen where fascist Germany was heading.

Ultimately the marriage to Hoffman saved Langgässer from deportation. However, her daughter, Cordelia, whose father was a prominent Jew, was deported aged 15. Cordelia was deported to Theresienstadt and then Auschwitz in 1944. Cordelia survived following an exchange of camp inmates with German prisoners in Sweden.

Post-war years 

Langgässer wrote and publish prolifically in the immediate post-war years. Her most famous works were published shortly after the war. She became known as an author of the Inner emigration because she stayed in Germany during the Nazi reign, opposed the Nazi doctrine but was not outwardly critical of it. She continued to write until just before her death from multiple sclerosis on 25 July 1950. Following her death Langgässer was posthumously awarded the Georg Büchner Prize in 1950.

Legacy 
As a well-known pre-war author who became victim of the Nazi racial laws Langgässer received a lot of public and academic attention after her death. Her works found fame and a readership in the immediate post-war period. Less noted have been her letters, which were published by her husband after her death in 1954 under the title ...soviel berauschende  Vergänglichkeit: Briefe 1926–1950 (...so much intoxicating transience: Letters 1926–1950). Langgässer's letters were republished by her granddaughter Elisabeth Hoffmann, the daughter of Cordelia, in 1990. The letters give an insight into the effects the Nuremberg Laws on her family and cover the period from 1933 until 1945.

Langgässer's daughter Cordelia had several children with a Swedish Protestant, becoming Cordelia Edvardson. She immigrated to Israel at the height of the Yom Kippur War in 1973 and wrote a searing autobiography, Burnt Child Seeks the Fire.

See also 
 Christa Wolf

References 

1899 births
1950 deaths
German Roman Catholics
People from Rhenish Hesse
Roman Catholic writers
People from Alzey
Georg Büchner Prize winners
German women novelists
German women poets
20th-century German poets
20th-century German novelists
20th-century German women writers
German people of Jewish descent
Neurological disease deaths in Germany
Deaths from multiple sclerosis